Anthony Dickinson Sayre (April 29, 1858 – November 17, 1931) was a justice of the Supreme Court of Alabama from 1909 to 1931.

Biography 
Born in Tuskegee, Alabama to parents Daniel Sayre and Musidora Sayre (née Morgan), his parents were early settlers in Alabama who moved from Ohio (father) and Tennessee (mother). He was a nephew of Senator John Tyler Morgan. After two years of private school, Sayre enrolled in Roanoke College in Virginia. He returned to study law under Judge Thomas Mann Arrington (1829-1895). In 1863 T.M. Arrington was a Lt. Col. in Vicksburg, MS in the Confederacy. In 1880s Judge Arrington was trial judge in Montgomery. In 1880, Sayre was admitted to the bar.

For the next thirty years, he represented cities and counties in various capacities. He had served as clerk of the city court from 1883 to 1889, Montgomery County's representative in the state legislature from 1890 to 1893 and state senator from 1894 to 1897. He had served as president of the State Senate during his second term. He resigned from the Senate when in 1897 he was elected Montgomery city court judge, to which he was re-elected in 1903.

State Supreme Court 
In 1909, Associate Justice James R. Dowdell became Chief Justice and Sayre was appointed by Governor Braxton Bragg Comer as associate justice. He served for the next 22 years.  He was considered to be anti-death penalty and anti-formalist. Zelda Fitzgerald wrote in her semi-autobiographical Save Me the Waltz that Sayre was remote and distant.

Personal life 
Sayre married Minerva "Minnie" Buckner Machen (1860-1958), daughter of Willis Benson Machen and his third wife, the former Victoria Theresa Mims, of Eddyville, Kentucky on January 17, 1884, in Lyon County, Kentucky. They had eight children (three of whom died in infancy): Daniel Morgan Sayre (1884-1885) (died at eighteen months of spinal meningitis), Marjorie Sayre (1886-1960) (Mrs. Minor Williamson Brinson), Daniel Morgan Sayre (1887-1888) (died as an infant), Rosalind "Tootsie" Sayre (1889-1979) (Mrs. Newman Smith), Clothilde "Tilde" Sayre (1891-before 1986) (Mrs. John Munford Palmer), Anthony Dickinson Sayre Jr. (1894-1933) (died of complications from malaria), Lenora Sayre (1897-1899) (died of diphtheria at age two) and Zelda Sayre (1900-1948) (the wife of novelist F. Scott Fitzgerald).

He was a Democrat. Sayre died November 17, 1931, at age 73.

References 

Justices of the Supreme Court of Alabama
1858 births
1931 deaths
People from Tuskegee, Alabama
Politicians from Montgomery, Alabama
Democratic Party members of the Alabama House of Representatives
Democratic Party Alabama state senators
Lawyers from Montgomery, Alabama